American Film Company may refer to:

American Film Manufacturing Company, also called Flying "A" Studios, an early motion picture production company based in Santa Barbara, California
Mutual Film, a motion picture conglomerate and distributor for movie studios including Flying "A"
American Film Company (2008), a film production company founded in 2008